The 2016 IndyCar Grand Prix at The Glen presented by Hitachi was the 15th round of the 2016 IndyCar Series. The race was scheduled Labor Day weekend and occurred on September 4, 2016. It marked the first time that the series had visited the course since 2010 and the 10th time the series had visited the circuit in its history.

Background

Watkins Glen International was a late addition to the 2016 IndyCar Series schedule. Following the cancellation of the Grand Prix of Boston, Indycar and Watkins Glen reached an agreement for Watkins Glen to be the replacement venue. It was slotted as the penultimate race of the season.

Following the 2015 NASCAR event at the circuit, the course had been repaved. As a result, speeds for the IndyCars were expected to greatly increase from where they were in 2010.

Report

Qualifying

Qualifying took place on Saturday, September 3. Scott Dixon took pole position with a time of 1:22.5259, demolishing the previous track record by over five seconds and setting an average lap speed of 146 mph (230 km/h); which made Watkins Glen the fastest road circuit on the IndyCar calendar- even faster than Road America. Championship contender Will Power qualified in second, while Sébastien Bourdais qualified third. Championship leader Simon Pagenaud qualified in seventh.

Three drivers were given penalties during qualification, all for interfering with other drivers. James Hinchcliffe and Graham Rahal received this penalty during round one of qualifying, while Mikhail Aleshin was penalized during round two.

Race

The race took place on September 4, 2016. The start saw Scott Dixon and Will Power maintain their positions, while Simon Pagenaud managed an excellent start that allowed him to jump up to seventh position. As the field came through the first turn, two separate incidents occurred. Sébastien Bourdais was first forced into the tire barriers on the inside of the turn. At the same time, Juan Pablo Montoya and Mikhail Aleshin came together, sending both into a spin. All cars were able to continue and no full course caution was needed. As the race continued, Dixon began to pull out a sizable lead on Power, while Pagenaud came under pressure from Tony Kanaan and the other drivers he had past at the start. On lap 13, Kanaan was finally able to get around Pagenaud to move into the top 3.

Green flag pit stops began around lap 10. Dixon was the first of the leaders to pit on lap 14. This would prove a huge advantage for Dixon, as the first caution of the race flew one lap later when the left-rear tire on Mikhail Aleshin's car deflated in turn four, sending into a spin and into the wall on the backstretch. This forced all other leaders to pit under caution and lose track position to those who had already pitted. Of those forced to pit under yellow, Kanaan emerged from the pits first, followed by Pagenaud and then Power, who had an uncharacteristically slow stop. Up front, Dixon re-inherited the lead, while his teammate Max Chilton moved to second and Team Penske's Juan Pablo Montoya to third. Kanaan, the best of the cars who pitted, was 12th.

Racing resumed on lap 19 with Dixon pulling out even faster than before. However, after only one lap, caution flew again when Charlie Kimball and Graham Rahal made contact exiting turn one, sending Rahal spinning into the inside barriers. During the caution, Hélio Castroneves and RC Enerson pitted to top off with fuel. One lap before the restart, Kanaan suddenly slowed with a broken toe-link in the rear suspension of his car. While he eventually brought the car back to pit lane, the repairs cost him two laps and removed his chances of a high placing.

Racing once again resumed on lap 24, and in only two laps, Dixon had extended his lead back out over five seconds. On lap 28, Montoya moved around Chilton to put himself in second. Pit stops came again around lap 30. Dixon pitted on lap 31, handing the lead over to Montoya. Montoya would pit the next lap, however, which handed the lead over to James Hinchcliffe. Further back in the field, Will Power came in for a pit stop earlier than his championship rival Simon Pagenaud. However, after coming out in the middle of slower traffic, Power lost significant ground to Pagenaud, giving Pagenaud a gap and a potential increase in his points lead. On lap 33, Hinchcliffe came in for his pit stop, which handed the lead to Hélio Castroneves. Castroneves managed to stay out until lap 36, which handed the lead once again to Scott Dixon.

On lap 39, the third and final caution of the day occurred when Charlie Kimball and Will Power made contact in turn four, sending Power into the outside wall. Following examination in the infield care center after the incident, medical staff stated that Power had displayed concussion-like symptoms and would not be cleared to race at the following round until he underwent further testing. For the rest of the field, the incident allowed for the final pit stops of the day, with the exceptions of Carlos Muñoz, Marco Andretti, and Takuma Sato, who all stayed out. During pit stops, Castroneves was able to leap frog Dixon, making him leader of those who had pitted. Josef Newgarden, Juan Pablo Montoya, and Simon Pagenaud emerged behind them.

Racing once again resumed on lap 42, where Dixon immediately moved back around Castroneves. Only two laps later, Dixon had passed all those who had stayed out during the caution and resumed the lead. Muñoz remained in second position until his pit stop on lap 49. At this time, nearly all teams became concerned about making it to the end of the race on fuel. As such, several drivers attempted to conserve fuel. The saving caused the order to be shuffled. Pagenaud began to drop back through the field, while Castroneves, Max Chilton, and Charlie Kimball were all forced to take a splash of fuel in the closing laps of the race. On the same lap, Juan Pablo Montoya spun in turn three, ruining what seemed set for a good finish.

Up front, there were no concerns for Scott Dixon, who coasted easily to victory. Behind him, however, last lap drama occurred when second place runner James Hinchcliffe, who had moved up in the order as others pitted, ran out of fuel and coasted to a halt only two turns from the finish. Josef Newgarden moved by to take second, while Castroneves managed to take the last step of the podium despite his pit stop. Conor Daly, despite running out of fuel, came across the line fourth, making him both the highest finishing Honda and highest finishing rookie in the race. Sébastien Bourdais rounded out the top five. Hinchcliffe dropped all the way down the order to 18th following his heartbreaking finish.

Scott Dixon's victory was the 40th victory of his career and his fourth at Watkins Glen International. Dixon dominated the race, leading all but 10 of the race's 60 laps and finishing over 16 seconds ahead of second place. In victory lane, Dixon announced that he would donate his entire prize winnings to the Justin Wilson Children's Fund. The championship standings saw major changes during as a result of the event, with Simon Pagenaud and Will Power becoming the only two drivers still able to win. Pagenaud's seventh-place finish allowed him to extend his lead by almost twenty points following Power's incident and subsequent 20th-place finish, giving Pagenaud a significant margin heading into the final race of the season.

Results

Qualifying

Source for individual rounds:

Race

Notes
 Points include 1 point for leading at least 1 lap during a race, an additional 2 points for leading the most race laps, and 1 point for Pole Position.

Source for time gaps:

Championship standings after the race

Drivers' Championship standings

 Note: Only the top five positions are included.

External links
 Official Pit Stop Data

References

IndyCar Grand Prix at The Glen
2016 IndyCar Grand Prix at The Glen
2016 IndyCar Grand Prix at The Glen
September 2016 sports events in the United States